Eileen A. Malloy (born July 9, 1954) served as the Deputy Assistant Secretary of State for European and Canadian affairs in the United States Department of State. She served as the United States Ambassador to Kyrgyzstan from 1994 to 1997.

Career
In 1975, Malloy graduated from Georgetown University's Edmund A. Walsh School of Foreign Service with a BSFS. She is fluent in Russian. Malloy joined the United States Foreign Service in 1978. She served in the U.S. embassies in Ireland, the United Kingdom, Kyrgyzstan, twice in the U.S. embassy in Russia, the second time as Chief of the Arms Control Implementation Unit, in U.S. Consulate General Calgary in Canada, and as the U.S. Consul General in Sydney, NSW, Australia. United States President Bill Clinton announced his intention to nominate her as the U.S. Ambassador to Kyrgyzstan on 12 July 1994.

Family
Malloy is married to James G. McLachlan. She has two daughters, Mary Kathryn Paegle and Christina Alana McLachlan.

References

Ambassadors of the United States to Kyrgyzstan
Living people
1954 births
Walsh School of Foreign Service alumni
People from Teaneck, New Jersey
United States Foreign Service personnel
American women ambassadors
21st-century American women